The Seohae Line is a dual-track, electrified rail line in western Gyeonggi-do, South Korea. The Seohae Line is being built in four sections simultaneously. There is a transfer to the Seoul Subway Line 1 at its start in Sosa, the Sin Ansan Line at Siheung City Hall, and Seoul Subway Line 4 at Ansan. There are currently 14 stations (Wonjong-Wonsi). The line is operated by SEO HAE RAIL CO.,LTD., which is a subsidiary of Seoul Metro. However the infrastructure is owned by Korail so the rail line runs on the left like the rest of the South Korean mainline railway network.

History 
After the completion of planning, the project was written out as a build–lease–transfer (BLT) project, and Daewoo was selected as preferred bidder in September 2008.  Construction was scheduled to last from October 2009 to March 2013.  Due to the global financial crisis, it was difficult to gather investors to finance the project, and negotiations stalled.  An agreement was finally signed on December 21, 2010, with construction set to start in the first half of 2011.  Project costs are 1.5248 trillion South Korean won, the contractor has altogether seven years for design and construction, and will manage and maintain the line for the first 20 years of operation.

The first section began construction in 2011 and opened on June 16, 2018.

Future
On September 1, 2010, the South Korean government announced a strategic plan to reduce travel times from Seoul to 95% of the country to under 2 hours by 2020. As part of the plan, the first section is to be further upgraded for 230 km/h, the Wonsi–Hwayang extension is to be projected for 250 km/h, and the line may see KTX service.

The second section will run north from Sosa to Daegok on the Gyeongui-Jungang Line and Seoul Subway Line 3, though service will continue until Ilsan. There will be transfers to several other lines. It was proposed to open on June 29, 2021, but has been postponed. Currently, the rest of the extension (Sosa-Ilsan) is expected to open after March 2023.

Tentative plans foresee the upgrade and incorporation of the Gyooe Line, a single-track non-electrified line without passenger service that connects Neunggok station (with a junction just before Daegok station) and Uijeongbu station in Uijeongbu. The Uijeongbu–Daegok–Sosa–Wonsi Line would then provide orbital metro service as a northern semicircle around Seoul, complementing the southern semicircle formed by the Bundang Line and the Suin Line.

From the Wonsi end, a southern extension connecting up with the Janghang Line before Hongseong station is under consideration.

Stations

Urban section
The section from Sosa to Wonsi opened on June 16, 2018. The line currently utilizes seven four-car Class 391000 trains manufactured by Hyundai Rotem; when the line is extended, it will be supplemented by ten additional four-car Class 391000 trains manufactured by Dawonsys.

The line is being extended northward from Sosa to Ilsan, and southward from Wonsi to Seohwaseongnamyang. Station names may be subject to change as the line is constructed and various sources give conflicting information.

Conventional Rail

See also
 Transportation in South Korea
 Korail

References

Seohae Line
Transport in Seoul
Railway lines in South Korea
Seoul Metropolitan Subway lines
Airport rail links in South Korea